Penguin Island is an Australian natural history television documentary series about the little penguin.

The series premiered on 30 June 2010 on BBC TV.  In Australia the show airs on ABC TV. The executive producer and series producer is Sally Ingleton and the series director is Simon Target and the director of photography is David Parer.  Penguin Island was produced by 360 Degree Films, ABC Documentary, Film Victoria, BBC Television and Arte France.  The series comprises six half-hour episodes and was filmed over a year and a half from commencing spring 2007.

Penguin Island uses the latest underwater satellite tracking and Big Brother-style video surveillance to tell the story of several penguin families who live in a colony where relationships are fraught and survival is tenuous.

Over six 30-minute episodes, Penguin Island follows the penguins as a dedicated team of rangers and scientists monitor and protect them through the breeding season.

Filmed over a year by some of Australia's best documentary filmmakers, Penguin Island offers a rewarding insight into the lives of the stars of Phillip Island's internationally renowned Penguin Parade.

Penguin Island first screened in Australia on 30 September 2010.

Episodes

Season 1: 2010

The penguins
 Rocky
 Jess (Rocky's mate)
 Tilda (daughter of Rocky and Jess)
 Spike
 Bluey
 Sheila
 Sammy and Tom (sons of Bluey and Sheila)
 Butch
 Bruiser.

See also
 List of Australian television series
 List of Australian Broadcasting Corporation programs

References

External links
 ABC TV – Penguin Island
 
 Edwards, Lorna: Phillip Island's penguins hit the small screen, The Age
 Media Release
 Penguin Island
 Phillip Island's Penguins hit the little screen

2010 Australian television series debuts
Australian factual television series
Australian Broadcasting Corporation original programming
Television shows set in Victoria (Australia)
Television series about penguins
Films scored by Dale Cornelius
2010s Australian documentary television series